Red, White & Blues is the eighth album by The Blues Brothers, released in 1992. It is their first studio album, other than the soundtracks from the movies The Blues Brothers (1980) and Blues Brothers 2000 (1999). It is also the only album that contains original material, such as "Red, White & Blues", "Take You and Show You" and "Can't Play the Blues (In an Air-Conditioned Room)". 
The album was recorded at the Power Station studio in New York. Original band member Tom Malone had left the band the year before to join the Gil Evans orchestra and was replaced by Birch Johnson.

Track listing 
 "You Got the Bucks" (L. Marini-P. Marini)– 3:30
 "Red, White & Blues" (M. Moreno-A. Rubin-L. Pendarvis) – 3:55
 "Can't Play the Blues (In an Air-Conditioned Room)" (R. Fagan-J. Kennedy)– 3:15
 "Early in the Morning" (L. Jordan-D. Hartley-L. Hickman) – 3:39
 "One Track Train" (S. Cropper-G. Nicholson) – 4:16
 "Boogie Thing" (J. Cotton-M. Murphy)– 3:37
 "Never Found a Girl" (Booker T. Jones-E. Floyd) – 5:51
 "Trick Bag" (E. King) – 4:25
 "Take You and Show You" (L. Pendarvis-B. Johnson) – 4:08
 "Big Bird" (Booker T. Jones-E. Floyd) – 4:58

Credits 
Elwood Blues – harmonica, backing vocals, lead vocals on track 2
Steve "The Colonel" Cropper – guitar
Donald "Duck" Dunn – bass guitar
Lou "Blue Lou" Marini – tenor saxophone, alto saxophone
Matt "Guitar" Murphy – lead guitar
Alan "Mr. Fabulous" Rubin – trumpet
Eddie Floyd – lead vocals
Larry Thurston – lead vocals
Danny "G-Force" Gottlieb – drums
Birch Johnson – trombone
Leon Pendarvis – keyboards, piano, backing vocals, musical director
Carla Thomas – Backing vocals

References

The Blues Brothers albums
1992 live albums